Villanueva del Río y Minas is a city located in the province of Seville, Spain. According to the 2018 census (INE), the city has a population of 4096 inhabitants.

References

External links
Villanueva del Río y Minas - Sistema de Información Multiterritorial de Andalucía

Municipalities of the Province of Seville